Goldbach's comet is the name given to a plot of  the function , the so-called Goldbach function .  The function, studied in relation to Goldbach's conjecture, is defined for all even integers  to be the number of different ways in which E can be expressed as the sum of two primes.  For example,  since 22 can be expressed as the sum of two primes in three different ways.

The coloring of points in the above image is based on the value of  modulo 3 with red points corresponding to 0 mod 3, blue points corresponding to 1 mod 3 and green points corresponding to 2 mod 3. In other words, the red points are multiples of 6, the blue points are multiples of 6 plus 2, and the green points are multiples of 6 plus 4.

Anatomy of the Goldbach Comet 

An illuminating way of presenting the comet data is as a histogram.  The function  can be normalized by dividing by the locally averaged value of g, gav, taken over perhaps 1000 neighboring values of the even number E.   The histogram can then be accumulated over a range of up to about 10% either side of a central E. 

Such a histogram appears on the right. A series of well-defined peaks is evident. The major peaks correspond to lowest factors of 3, 5, 7 ... as labeled. As the lowest factors become higher the peaks move left and eventually merge to give the lowest value primary peak.

This hierarchy continues until all factors are exhausted.  

The magnified section shows the succession of subsidiary peaks in more detail. 

The relative location of the peaks follows from the form developed by Hardy and Littlewood:

The factor on the right is Hardy–Littlewood's twin prime constant

Here the product is taken over all primes greater than 2.

Of particular interest is the peak formed by selecting only values of  that are prime.  The product factor in equation (1) is then very close to 1.  The peak is very close to a Gaussian form (shown in gray).  For this range of E values, the peak location is within 0.03% of the ideal . 

However, it is a factor of about 1.85 less than the value  that would be expected from a hypothesis of totally random occurrence of prime-pair matching. This may be expected, since there are correlations that give rise to the separated peaks in the total histogram.  

Returning to the full range of  rather than just primes, it is seen that other peaks associated with specified lowest factors of  can also be fitted by a Gaussian, but only on their lower shoulder.  The upper shoulder, being formed by an aggregate of subsidiary peaks, lies above the simple Gaussian form.

The relative heights of the peaks in the total histogram are representative of the populations of various types of  having differing factors. Thus the height of the peak marked (3,5) in the overall histogram is about 1/15 of the main peak. Heights may vary from this by about 20%; their exact value is a complex function of the way in which the peaks are constituted from their components and of their varying width.

It is interesting to speculate on the possibility of any number E having zero prime pairs, taking these Gaussian forms as probabilities, and assuming it is legitimate to extrapolate to the zero-pair point.  If this is done, the probability of zero pairs for any one E, in the range considered here, is of order 10−3700. The integrated probability over all E to infinity, taking into account the narrowing of the peak width, is not much larger.  Any search for violation of the Goldbach conjecture may reasonably be expected to have these odds to contend with.

References

Prime numbers